Amudhavalli is a 1959 Indian, Tamil-language film directed by A. K. Sekar. The film stars T. R. Mahalingam and M. N. Rajam.

Cast and Crew
The details were adapted from the database of Film News Anandan.

Cast

T. R. Mahalingam
M. N. Rajam
R. Nagendra Rao
Tambaram Lalitha
S. A. Natarajan
Lakshmiprabha
P. S. Venkatachalam
Radhakrishnan

Crew

Producer: M. Somasundaram
Director: A. K. Sekar
Story & Dialogues: R. Ramanathan
Cinematography: Rajagopal, G. K. Ramu
Editing: S. P. S. Veerappan
Art: A. K. Sekar
Choreography: P. Jayaram, D. C. Thangaraj
Photography: Venkatachary, Vinayagam
Studio: Neptune

Soundtrack
Music was composed by the duo Viswanathan–Ramamoorthy, while the lyrics were penned by Udumalai Narayana Kavi, Thanjai N. Ramaiah Dass, Kannadasan, Pattukkottai Kalyanasundaram and Muthukoothan. Singer is T. R. Mahalingam and the Playback singers are Sirkazhi Govindarajan, S. C. Krishnan, P. Leela, A. P. Komala, T. V. Rathnam, P. Susheela and L. R. Eswari.

References

Indian drama films
Films scored by Viswanathan–Ramamoorthy
1950s Tamil-language films